In Greek mythology, Hesperis ( Hesperís means 'evening') was (according to one account) the daughter of Hesperus, and the mother of the Hesperides by Atlas.

Because of her beauty she was also associated with Aphrodite.

Classical Literature Sources 
Chronological listing of classical literature sources for Hesperis:

 Callimachus, Epigram 38 (trans. Mair) (Greek poetry C3rd BC)
 Scholiast on Callimachus, Epigram 38 66 (Callimachus and Lycophron Aratus Mair 1921 pp. 163, 629)
 Diodorus Siculus, Library of History 4. 26. 3 ff
 Diodorus Siculus, Library of History 18. 20. 3 ff (trans. Oldfather) (Greek history C1st BC)
 Pliny, Natural History 4. 12. 58 ff (trans. Rackham) (Roman encyclopedia C1st AD)
 Pliny, Natural History 21. 18 ff (trans. Bostock & Riley) (Roman historian C1st AD)
 Pseudo-Hyginus, Fabulae 183 (trans. Grant) (Roman mythography C2nd AD)
 Third Vatican Mythographer, Scriptores rerum mythicarum 13 (Hercules) 5. 40 ff (ed. Bode) (Greek and Roman mythography C11th AD to C13th AD)

See also
Hesperia or Hesperides
Hesperium
Hesperos or Hesperus

References

Greek goddesses